Itäsaaret (Finnish), Östra holmarna (Swedish) is a southeastern neighborhood of Helsinki, Finland.

Neighbourhoods of Helsinki